Francisco Montealegre Fernández  (1818–1875) was a Costa Rican politician and businessman.

Early life and business career
Montealegre was born in San José, Costa Rica in 1818. He was the son of Mariano Montealegre Bustamante y Gerónima Fernández Chacón. He later married Victoriana Gallegos Sáenz, the daughter of the head of state José Rafael de Gallegos y Alvarado.

He studied business in Great Britain.  Upon returning to Costa Rica, he was active in the business world. He was the owner of valuable coffee plantations and was partner and manager of the powerful Banco Anglo-Costarricense. He also participated in other activities such as gold mining and the importation and sale of British goods.

Political career
During the first phase of the war against William Walker's filibusters, Montealegre served as an aide to President Juan Rafael Mora Porras, together with his brother Mariano Montealegre Fernández. From 1858 to 1859 he was also Deputy for San José and was among the opponents of the Cañas-Jerez Treaty, which left Costa Rica without access to Lake Nicaragua and with a limited right of navigation in the lower reaches of the San Juan River.

Montealegre was out of the country in 1859, when a military coup overthrew Moro and installed his brother José María Montealegre Fernández in his place. During the latter's government (1860–1863), he was an important political figure as the Secretary of the Treasury and Commerce.

In 1868, the Constitutional Convention Party announced his candidacy for the presidency for the elections of 1869, but he declined the nomination. He was a member of the Constituent Assemblies of 1869 and 1870.

Later years

In 1872 he moved to San Francisco, California, where he died in 1875.

1818 births
1875 deaths
People from San José, Costa Rica
Vice presidents of Costa Rica
Members of the Legislative Assembly of Costa Rica